Dimitriu is a Romanian surname that may refer to:

Anatolie Dimitriu (born June 19, 1973), Moldovan politician
Constantin Dimitriu-Dovlecel (1872–1945), Romanian lawyer and politician
Mihai Dimitriu, Moldovan politician who served in the Moldovan Parliament 1990–1994

Romanian-language surnames